The North Wisconsin District is one of the 35 districts of the Lutheran Church–Missouri Synod (LCMS), and covers the northern two-thirds of Wisconsin as well as the western half of Michigan's Upper Peninsula. In addition, one congregation in the district's area is in the non-geographic SELC District. The southern third of Wisconsin makes up the South Wisconsin District, and the remainder of Michigan constitutes the Michigan District; there are also two Wisconsin congregations in the Minnesota North District. The North Wisconsin District includes approximately 220 congregations and missions, subdivided into 20 circuits, as well as 40 preschools, 21 elementary schools and 3 high schools. Baptized membership in district congregations is approximately 102,000.

The North Wisconsin District was formed in 1916 when the Wisconsin District was divided. District offices are located in Wausau, Wisconsin.  Delegates from each congregation meet in convention every three years to elect the district president, vice presidents, circuit counselors, a board of directors, and other officers.

Presidents
Rev. Johann Gotthilf Schliepsiek, 1916–18
Rev. Samuel William Herman Daib, 1918–36
Rev. William Louis Kohn, 1936–54
Rev. Lloyd H. Goetz, 1954–74
Rev. Henry E. Simon, 1974–85
Rev. Arleigh L. Lutz, Jr., 1985-2006
Rev. Joel A. Hoelter, 2006-2011
Rev. Paul Weber, 2011-2012
Rev. Dwayne Lueck, 2012-present

References

External links
North Wisconsin District web site
LCMS: North Wisconsin District
LCMS Congregation Directory

Lutheran Church–Missouri Synod districts
Lutheranism in Michigan
Lutheranism in Wisconsin
Christian organizations established in 1916